Buffalo Shore Estates is an unincorporated community located in the town of Packwaukee, Marquette County, Wisconsin, United States.

Notes

Unincorporated communities in Marquette County, Wisconsin
Unincorporated communities in Wisconsin